Ough is a surname. Notable people with the surname include:

 Bruce R. Ough (born 1951), Bishop of the United Methodist Church
 Onyinye Ough, Nigerian author, speaker, and political activist
 Wayne Ough (born 1978), Australian baseball player